Erica Oyama (born 28 March 1981) is a television writer and producer. She created and wrote the comedy series Burning Love.

Oyama was born and raised in Birmingham, Alabama, and went to the Alabama School of Fine Arts. She is married to actor and comedian Ken Marino. She is sister to comedian Zac Oyama, known for his work in CollegeHumor videos and their tabletop roleplaying game series Dimension 20.

References

External links
 

1981 births
American film producers
American people of Japanese descent
Living people
People from Birmingham, Alabama
American women television writers
21st-century American screenwriters